This is a list of members of the Senate of Canada in the 1st Parliament of Canada.

Queen Victoria granted Royal Assent to the British North America Act on March 29, 1867, forming the new nation of Canada on July 1 of 1867. Dominion elections were held in August and September to elect the first Canadian Parliament. Prior to the first sitting of Parliament, the Members of Parliament met to appoint the 72 senators to the Canadian Senate.

The 72 seats in the initial Canadian Senate were divided as follows: 24 to Ontario, 24 to Quebec, 12 to New Brunswick, 12 to Nova Scotia. Of the 72 appointed, two declined the appointment, and 2 seats remained vacant.

The province of Quebec has 24 Senate divisions which are constitutionally mandated. In all other provinces, a Senate division is strictly an optional designation of the senator's own choosing, and has no real constitutional or legal standing. A senator who does not choose a special senate division is designated a senator for the province at large.

On July 15, 1870, Manitoba became the 5th Canadian province and was allotted 2 seats in the Senate.  With the increase, the number of seats in the Senate rose to 74.  The seats were not filled until December 13, 1871, when Lord Lisgar, on the advice of John A. Macdonald, filled those two seats.

On July 20, 1871, British Columbia became the 6th Canadian province and was allotted 3 seats in the Senate bringing the combined number of seats in the Senate to 77.  On December 13, 1871, Lord Lisgar, on the advice of John A. Macdonald, appointed three persons to fill those seats.

List of senators

Senators at the beginning of the 1st Parliament

† Members of the Liberal-Conservative Party were associated with the Conservative Party of Canada.

Senators appointed during the 1st Parliament

†  Members of the Liberal-Conservative Party were associated with the Conservative Party of Canada.

 Senators in bold were cabinet ministers during the 1st Parliament

Changes in party affiliation during the 1st Parliament

See also
List of House members of the 1st Parliament of Canada
List of current Canadian senators

References

01
1st Canadian Parliament